The 2017–18 season is Rochdale's 111th year in existence and their fourth consecutive season in League One. Along with competing in League One, the club participated in the FA Cup, EFL Cup and EFL Trophy. The season covers the period from 1 July 2017 to 30 June 2018.

Statistics

     
  
 

           

|-
!colspan=14|Player(s) who left during the season:
  

|}

Goals record

Disciplinary record

Transfers

Transfers in

Transfers out

Loans in

Loans out

Competitions

Friendlies
As of 23 June 2017, Rochdale have announced six pre-season friendlies against Chorley Barnsley, Morecambe, FC Halifax Town, AFC Fylde and Middlesbrough.

League One

League table

Results summary

Results by matchday

Matches
On 21 June 2017, the league fixtures were announced.

FA Cup
In the FA Cup, Rochdale were drawn at home to Bromley in the first round, Slough Town away in the second round and Doncaster Rovers away in the third round.

EFL Cup
On 16 June 2017, Rochdale were drawn away to Mansfield Town in the first round.

EFL Trophy
On 12 July 2017, Rochdale were drawn in the Northern Group C against Blackburn Rovers, Bury and Stoke City U23s. As winners of their group, Rochdale were drawn at home to Doncaster Rovers in the second round. A home tie against Lincoln City was confirmed for the third round stage.

References

Rochdale
Rochdale A.F.C. seasons